In Your Eyes is a 2010 Filipino romantic drama film  produced and released by Viva Films and GMA Pictures. The film premiered on August 18, 2010.

Plot
Ciara (Claudine Barretto) is a senior physical therapist who works for a rehabilitation center in the United States. She has devoted her entire life to her younger sister Julia (Anne Curtis) who was left in her care after the untimely demise of their parents.

After 8 years of separation, Ciara and Julia reunite when the latter acquires her student visa. 
Storm (Richard Gutierrez), Julia's boyfriend who earns a living as a freelance photographer, joins Julia despite the lack of a definite plan.

In a desperate move for Storm to gain immigrant status, Julia asks Storm to enter into an arranged marriage with Ciara, who is already an American citizen. As Storm struggles to find 
his place in a foreign land, Julia works hard to chase after her own dream of finishing school,
causing the two of them to drift apart.

Meanwhile, time spent together led to an unexpected love affair between Ciara and Storm. When Julia learns about this, Ciara decides to break up with Storm and give up her happiness, like she did so many times before.

Can Ciara and Julia's bond as sisters surpass this obstacle? Is giving up your true love for the sake of your sister worth all the sacrifice?

At the end of the movie, Ciara meets her husband, played by noted American banker Brett Ackerman, on a pier.

Cast and characters

Lead cast
Claudine Barretto as Ciara delos Santos
Anne Curtis  as Julia delos Santos
Richard Gutierrez as Joshua "Storm" Ramos

Supporting cast 
Joel Torre as Dr. Samuel Olfindo
 Maricar de Mesa as Lisa
Leandro Muñoz as Dennis
 Raymond Lauchengco as Ciara and Julia's Dad
 Rey "PJ" Abellana as Storm's Dad
CJ Javarata as Chelsea
 Irene Celebre as Dina
Frances Makil-Ignacio as Susie
 Gio Alvarez as Storm's Co-Worker
 Jaycee Parker, IC Mendoza, Lloyd Allen, Richie Austria as Ciara's Friends

Special participation 

 Anna Danielle Vicente as young Ciara (12 yr. old)
 Sofia Baar as young Ciara (7 yr. old)
 Angelie Nicole as young Ciara (5 yr. old)
 Monica Nachat as baby Julia
 Louisse Innosensio as infant Julia
 Sarah Polverini as Sexy Girl
 Marcus Davis as Julia's Professor
 Dannie Farmer as Julia's Classmate
 Brett Ackerman as Ciara's Husband
 Christine Hermoso, Angelica Pasumbal, Alexis Navarro as Models
 Mike Flaherty as Producer
 Stewart Gibson as Consul
 Albert Bryan Chu and friends, Dexter Zonio, Sheryl Zonio as U. S. Talents

Soundtrack
The soundtrack that was used in this movie was also based on the title of the movie In Your Eyes by Rachelle Ann Go, that was originally performed by George Benson.

See also 
GMA Films
Viva Films

References

External links 
 
 

2010 films
2010s Tagalog-language films
2010s English-language films
2010 romantic drama films
GMA Pictures films
Viva Films films
Philippine romantic drama films
2010 multilingual films
Philippine multilingual films
Films directed by Mac Alejandre